Dustin Benison Ware (born April 12, 1990) is an American professional basketball player who currently plays for MZT Skopje of the Macedonian League. After four years at Georgia, Ware entered the 2012 NBA draft but was not selected in the draft's two rounds.

High school career
Ware played high school basketball at North Cobb Christian School, in Kennesaw, Georgia.

College career 
Ware chose to play college basketball at Georgia after finishing high school at North Cobb Christian School. At Georgia, during his stay at the university, he was one of the best deep shooters on the team, and along with his teammate Trey Thompkins, he was a reliable defender. As a senior, Ware averaged 8.1 points, 2.3 assists and 2.2 rebounds per game.

Professional career
After going undrafted in the 2012 NBA draft, Ware started his professional career with Cibona of the Croatian League. He left the club after only one match.

In 2013, Ware joined Weißenhorn Youngstars, the development team of the Basketball Bundesliga side Ratiopharm Ulm, and spent almost the whole season with Youngstarson loan. On August, he joined Jászberényi KSE of the Nemzeti Bajnokság I/A, the highest professional league in Hungary. After one year with the club, Ware joined JA Vichy-Clermont, where he spent two seasons, being one of the leaders of the club.

On July 2, 2017, Ware signed with Boulazac Dordogne of the Pro A. On October he left the club and joined Lukoil Academic of the NBL. On December, he left Lukoil in order to join Kolossos Rodou of the Greek Basket League, replacing Malcolm Griffin on the team's squad.

On July 5, 2018, Ware joined Zalakerámia ZTE of the Hungarian League.

Ware joined Wilki Morskie Szczecin during the 2019-20 season and averaged 13.4 points and 5.6 assists per game. He re-signed with the team on November 7, 2020. In 2021, Ware signed with MZT Skopje and averaged 9.7 points, 6.4 assists, and 2.8 rebounds per game. On January 20, 2022, he signed with Champagne Châlons-Reims of the LNB Pro A.

References

External links 
RealGM.com profile
eurobasket.com profile
Georgia Bulldogs bio

1990 births
Living people
American expatriate basketball people in Bulgaria
American expatriate basketball people in Croatia
American expatriate basketball people in France
American expatriate basketball people in Germany
American expatriate basketball people in Greece
American expatriate basketball people in Hungary
American expatriate basketball people in Poland
American men's basketball players
Basketball players from Atlanta
Boulazac Basket Dordogne players
Champagne Châlons-Reims Basket players
Georgia Bulldogs basketball players
Jászberényi KSE players
JA Vichy-Clermont Métropole players
KK Cibona players
Kolossos Rodou B.C. players
PBC Academic players
Point guards
Ratiopharm Ulm players
ZTE KK players